is a former professional Japanese baseball pitcher. He had played for Hanshin Tigers and Tohoku Rakuten Golden Eagles of Nippon Professional Baseball (NPB) and De Glaskoning Twins of Honkbal Hoofdklasse.

References

External links

 NPB.com

1984 births
Living people
Hanshin Tigers players
Japanese expatriate baseball players in the Netherlands
Nippon Professional Baseball pitchers
Nippon Professional Baseball Rookie of the Year Award winners
Tohoku Rakuten Golden Eagles players
Baseball people from Fukuoka (city)
Sydney Blue Sox players
Japanese expatriate baseball players in Australia